The white-cheeked turaco (Menelikornis leucotis) is a species of bird in the family Musophagidae. It is found in Eritrea, Ethiopia, and South Sudan.
This species is the most commonly raised turaco in captive conditions.

Distribution and habitat
The white-cheeked turaco is native to Sudan, South Sudan, Ethiopia and Eritrea, where it is found in Podocarpus and juniper forests in the highland regions.

Subspecies
There are two subspecies, the nominate subspecies M. l. leucotis found in the Podocarpus forests of Eritrea, Ethiopia and southeastern South Sudan and M. l. donaldsoni found in south-central Ethiopia south of the Rift Valley and in the extreme west of Somalia. The latter is quite distinct in plumage colour - the eastern population is separated from the larger population by the escarpment.

The white-crested turaco has been shown to hybridise with the sympatric Ruspoli's turaco (Menelikornis ruspolii) that contributed more to concerns about Ruspoli's turaco that is considered endangered.

In captivity

In captivity a 'cinnamon' colour sport (a recessive colour mutation) first occurred spontaneously in birds bred by Mr D Jones in Gloucestershire, England and is now present in captive birds in other countries.

A single white-cheeked turaco has been living wild in east London (Leytonstone and South Woodford). The sighting was recorded and confirmed in October 2009. It has survived the climate and potential predators for at least seven years and appears to be living in harmony with native species. It's believed to be an escaped or released pet. Sightings in gardens have continued to delight Londoners.  In 2014 another bird (or the same one who fancied a change of scenery perhaps?) was sighted in Langton Green, Kent and has caused much interest to the residents, being featured in the village magazine.

Sightings in East London have continued into 2017 with the turaco seen in January enjoying scraps under bird feeders in residential gardens near Wanstead Park and in July flying around the treetops in Bushwood.  It was seen again in the trees opposite St Gabriel's Church, Aldersbrook, and photographed on 30 March 2021.  In addition, there have been various sightings of the same (or similar) bird in Wimbledon since April 2016. A turaco was sighted in Havant, Hampshire, in August 2019 and again in May 2020. It has a ring on the left leg. There have been confirmed sightings in Cardiff, Wales from January 2020 and has also been seen in March 2022.

Gallery

References

 International Turaco Society ITS Magazine 1993-2012

white-cheeked turaco
Birds of East Africa
Fauna of the Ethiopian Highlands
white-cheeked turaco
Taxonomy articles created by Polbot
Taxobox binomials not recognized by IUCN